The discography of American singer, songwriter, and actress Ariana Grande consists of six studio albums, two compilation albums, one live album, two extended plays (EPs), fifty-four singles (including seven as a featured artist), and fifteen promotional singles. After signing with Republic Records, she released her debut single "Put Your Hearts Up" in December 2011. Throughout her career thus far, Grande has sold over 90 million records worldwide, making her one of the best-selling music artists of all time. According to the Recording Industry Association of America (RIAA), she has sold 9 million albums and 63.5 million digital singles units as lead artist in the United States. Having amassed over 105 billion consumed streams thus far, Grande is the most streamed female artist ever. She is also the most streamed female artist on Spotify (2010s decade) and Apple Music. She has amassed 73 chart entries on the Billboard Hot 100—the fourth most entries for a female artist—including seven number ones and 20 top-10 hits so far. Grande was named the sixth top female artist of the 2010s decade (twelfth overall), and was ranked among Billboard's Greatest of All Time Hot 100 Artists, at number 78. Grande is also one of the most certified female artists in the UK, with nearly 25 million units.

In April 2013, Grande made her chart debut with "The Way" featuring American rapper Mac Miller, which peaked at number nine on the Billboard Hot 100 chart in the United States. Her debut studio album, Yours Truly, reached the top ten in multiple countries while debuting at number one on the US Billboard 200 albums chart, subsequently being certified Platinum in the US by the Recording Industry Association of America (RIAA). The album spawned two more singles in 2013: "Baby I" and "Right There", the former peaked at number six in Japan. In December 2013, Grande released her first extended play, Christmas Kisses, featuring four Christmas-themed tracks. The EP was re-released in December 2014, exclusive to Japan only, with one bonus track, Grande's Christmas single "Santa Tell Me".

Grande released her second studio album, My Everything, in August 2014. The album became her second consecutive number-one record on the Billboard 200. Its lead single, "Problem", became an international hit and reached the top 10 of many major music charts worldwide, including number two in the United States and number one in the United Kingdom. The subsequent two singles, "Break Free" and "Bang Bang", also achieved similar international success and, as "Problem", both reached the top five in the United States. All three singles managed to chart within the Billboard Hot 100's top 10 simultaneously, making Grande the second lead female artist to achieve the feat. The latter single also went on to become a number one hit single in the United Kingdom. The fourth and fifth singles from the album, "Love Me Harder" and "One Last Time", each respectively peaked at number 7 and number 13 in the United States, making her the only artist to score four top 10 hits on the Billboard Hot 100 in 2014. All singles from My Everything have been certified Platinum or more by the RIAA, while the album has been certified 2× Platinum. In June 2015, Grande released her first remix album, titled The Remix, exclusively to Japan only, consisting of tracks from her first two studio albums.

Grande's third studio album, Dangerous Woman, was released in May 2016. The record peaked at number two in the United States while topping the charts in the United Kingdom, Italy and 11 other countries. Its eponymous lead single debuted at number 10 and peaked at number eight on the Billboard Hot 100, making her the first and only artist in the chart's history to debut in the top 10 with the lead single from each of her first three albums. Her next two singles, "Into You" and "Side to Side", achieved commercial success, with both singles entering the top 20 in the United States and the United Kingdom. In February 2017, Grande and John Legend recorded and covered the song "Beauty and the Beast" for the 2017 live-action adaption of the same name. The theme song peaked at number 10 in Japan, and was certified Gold by the Recording Industry Association of Japan (RIAJ).

Grande released her fourth studio album, Sweetener, in August 2018 with its lead single, "No Tears Left to Cry". The album reached number one in Australia, Norway, and the US. The fifth studio album, Thank U, Next, was released in February 2019. The lead single of the same name debuted at number one simultaneously in the US and the UK. The next two singles, "7 Rings" and "Break Up with Your Girlfriend, I'm Bored", debuted at number one and number two respectively in the United States, and topped the charts in the United Kingdom. With these singles, Grande became the first solo artist to occupy the top three spots on the Billboard Hot 100 simultaneously. Both albums were commercial and critical successes, landing at the top of the charts globally, whilst breaking and setting multiple chart and streaming records. The latter album broke the records for the largest streaming week for a pop album and for a female album in the United States with 307 million on-demand streams. Grande's sixth studio album, Positions, was released in October 2020, with its lead single of the same name debuting at number one in the US and the UK simultaneously.

Albums

Studio albums

Live albums

Compilation albums

Extended plays

Singles

As lead artist

As featured artist

Holiday singles

Promotional singles

Other charted songs

Footnotes
Notes for albums and songs

Notes for peak chart positions

See also
Ariana Grande videography
List of songs recorded by Ariana Grande

References

External links
 Official website
 Ariana Grande at AllMusic
 
 

Discography
Discographies of American artists
Pop music discographies
Rhythm and blues discographies